Nizhnyaya Ivolga (Doodo Ivalga) is a rural locality (a selo) in Ivolginsky District, Republic of Buryatia, Russia. The population was 1,724 as of 2010. There are 101 streets.

Geography 
Nizhnyaya Ivolga is located 11 km northeast of Ivolginsk (the district's administrative centre) by road. Nur-Seleniye is the nearest rural locality.

References 

Rural localities in Ivolginsky District